Ryan Hepworth (born 16 January 1981) is a professional rugby league footballer who most recently played for the Dewsbury Rams in the Kingstone Press Championship. He plays as a prop or second row.

Hepworth previously played for the Sheffield Eagles in the Championship.

References

External links
Dewsbury Rams profile
Sheffield Eagles profile

Living people
1981 births
Rugby league props
Sheffield Eagles players
Dewsbury Rams players